West of the Law is a 1942 American Western film directed by Howard Bretherton and written by Adele Buffington. This is the eighth film in Monogram Pictures' Rough Riders series, and stars Buck Jones as Marshal Buck Roberts, Tim McCoy as Marshal Tim McCall and Raymond Hatton as Marshal Sandy Hopkins, with Evelyn Cook, Harry Woods and Jack Daley. The film was released on October 2, 1942, by Monogram Pictures.

Plot

Cast              
Buck Jones as Buck Roberts / Rocky Saunders
Tim McCoy as Tim McCall
Raymond Hatton as Sandy Hopkins
Evelyn Cook as Julie Todd 
Harry Woods as Jim Rand
Jack Daley as John Corbett
Malcolm 'Bud' McTaggart as Ray Mason 
Milburn Morante as Rufus Todd 
Roy Barcroft as Ludlow

See also
The Rough Riders series:
 Arizona Bound
 The Gunman from Bodie
 Forbidden Trails
 Below the Border
 Ghost Town Law
 Down Texas Way
 Riders of the West
 West of the Law

References

External links
 

1942 films
American Western (genre) films
1942 Western (genre) films
Monogram Pictures films
Films directed by Howard Bretherton
American black-and-white films
1940s English-language films
1940s American films